The Petit chien à bélière - small bound dog - or Pendeloque au chien de Suse - dog pendant of Susa - is a pendant in the form of a dog. The pendant was found in the tell of the Susa acropolis and dates to around 3300 BCE - 3100 BCE. The term bélière is a reference to the ring bound to the dog.

Description 
The pendant is a small object - only 1.5 cm long. It is one of the first examples of metalsmithing at the end of the 4th millennium BCE. It represents a synthesis of all the metallurgical techniques known in the region of Susa during the era of Uruk. It provides interesting information about one of the two known dog breeds in the Susan plain.

In this era, metallurgical techniques used a process where ore was melted to extract the metal and the metal was then poured into molds often at temperatures greater than 800 °C.

The fabrication techniques include cire perdue casting for the large part of the body and "hot drawing" of the ears and tail, with additional material for the back of the dog.

The connection of the ring with the main body cannot be made with a simple binding, for there is a risk of melting the main body. In what is one of the first examples of the use of brazing in history, a mixture of copper and gold is used without the need for an elevated temperature.

The dog is not representative of the elegant Arab greyhounds seen on ceramic vases discovered in the cities of Suse I, but is a domesticated rustic breed which was adapted for herding sheep.

History 
The pendant was discovered with the finds of R. de Mecquenem during the excavation of the city of Susa in 1939.

There are other sculptures of this type:

Bibliography
 .

External links 

 "Pendeloque" on the Louvre Museum website

References

Archaeological discoveries in Iraq
Individual pendants
Near East and Middle East antiquities of the Louvre
Gold objects